Alitia Vakatai Bavou Cirikiyasawa Bainivalu (born 1980/1981) is a Fijian politician and member of the Parliament of Fiji. She is a member of the People's Alliance.

Bainivalu is from Nabalabalain Ra Province. She worked as a civil servant for the Ministry of Fisheries for eight years, before studying in Japan for a master's degree in marine science. After returning to Fiji in 2022 she worked for the office of the opposition in parliament. She was one of six opposition staff laid off by the Social Democratic Liberal Party in the leadup to the 2022 election.

She was selected as a PA candidate in the 2022 Fijian general election, and was elected to Parliament, winning 1649 votes.

References

Living people
People from Ra Province
Fijian civil servants
People's Alliance (Fiji) politicians
21st-century Fijian women politicians
21st-century Fijian politicians
Members of the Parliament of Fiji
Year of birth missing (living people)